This is a list of philosophy-related events in the 14th century.

Events

Publications

Births

Deaths 
 Pietro d'Abano. Italian philosopher, astrologer, physician and professor of medicine in Padua.
 Abner of Burgos (12701347). Jewish philosopher that converted to Christianity, and polemical writer.

See also
List of centuries in philosophy

References 
Frederick Denison Maurice. Moral and Metaphysical Philosophy. New Edition. Macmillan and Co. London. 1872. Volume 2 ("Fourteenth century to the French Revolution with A Glimpse into the Nineteenth Century"). Chapter 1 ("The Fourteenth Century"). Pages 1 to 33.
William J Courtenay. Changing Approaches to Fourteenth-Century Thought. Pontifical Institute of Mediaeval Studies. 2007. (Etienne Gilson series, volume 29). Google Books.
Stephen F Brown, Thomas Dewender and Theo Kobusch (eds). Philosophical Debates at Paris in the Early Fourteenth Century. Brill. Leiden and Boston. 2009. Google Books

Medieval philosophy
Philosophy by century